is a video game developed and published by Imagineer Co. for the Sega Saturn.

Gameplay
Virtual Volleyball is the first volleyball game using polygons to be published for any game system.

Reception

Next Generation reviewed the Saturn version of the game, rating it one star out of five, and stated, "There are inherent problems in doing a volleyball game when considering the matter of trying to control an entire team, but Virtual Volleyball seems to make no effort to solve any of these problems, leaving the gamer with an extremely vacant feeling."

Notes

References

External links 
 Virtual Volleyball at GameFAQs

1995 video games
Japan-exclusive video games
Sega Saturn games
Sega Saturn-only games
Video games developed in Japan
Volleyball video games